Meitei Hindus or Manipuri Hindus are the adherents of Hinduism and are native to Manipur kingdom and the South East Asian regions. Meitei Hindus speak Meitei language (Manipuri language), which belongs to the Sino-Tibetan language family and adhere to the Vaishnava section of their religion, Hinduism.

History 
Though there were earlier Brahmin settlements in Medieval Manipur, the entire Meitei ethnicity remains to be ethno-religious to Sanamahism until the great historical event of the Puya Mei Thaba took place during the reign of Pamheiba, the then Emperor of Manipur kingdom, after which the entire ethnicity were forcibly converted into Hinduism.

Present Scenario 
In the past few decades, Meitei Hindu population is declining as the population of people following and practising the indigenous Meitei paganism (Sanamahism) is growing every year, which is inversely proportional to the Hindu population inside the Meitei ethnicity. Currently, Hindus account for 41℅ and the Sanamahists account for 8℅ out of the total population of Manipur according to 2011 census report. Presently, Sanamahists has approximately 2,40,000 officially registered followers.

See Also 

 Meitei Vaishnavism

Sources 

 https://www.imphaltimes.com/editorial/item/8582-redefining-manipuri-hindu
 https://themanipurpage.tripod.com/culture/culrel.html#B.%20VAISNAVISM%20IN%20MANIPUR
 http://themanipurpage.tripod.com/culture/culrel.html
 https://books.google.co.in/books?id=-CzSQKVmveUC&pg=PA14
 https://www.imphaltimes.com/it-articles/item/11978-conversion-into-hinduism-and-burning-of-meitei-puyas

References 

Manipur
Meitei culture
Pages with unreviewed translations